Heinz-Dieter Zeh (8 May 1932 – 15 April 2018), usually referred to as H. Dieter Zeh, was a professor (later professor emeritus) of the University of Heidelberg and theoretical physicist.

Work
Zeh was one of the developers of the many-minds interpretation of quantum mechanics and the discoverer of decoherence, first described in his seminal 1970 paper.

Bibliography
The Problem Of Conscious Observation In Quantum Mechanical Description (June, 2000).
The Physical Basis of the Direction of Time, 2001, 
Decoherence and the Appearance of a Classical World in Quantum Theory, 2003,  (with Erich Joos, Claus Kiefer, Domenico Giulini, Joachim Kupsch, Ion-Olimpiu Stamatescu)
 "On the interpretation of measurement in quantum theory", 1970, Foundations of Physics, Volume 1, Issue 1, pp. 69–76

See also
Epistemological Letters
Measurement problem
Quantum suicide and immortality

References

External links

Zeh's old homepage
Obituary for H. Dieter Zeh

1932 births
2018 deaths
20th-century German physicists
Quantum physicists
Science teachers
German science writers
Scientists from Braunschweig
Theoretical physicists
German male non-fiction writers
Academic staff of Heidelberg University